María Carolina Santa Cruz (born 22 August 1978) is an Argentine swimmer. She competed in three events at the 1996 Summer Olympics.

References

1978 births
Living people
Argentine female swimmers
Olympic swimmers of Argentina
Swimmers at the 1996 Summer Olympics
Place of birth missing (living people)